Gerry Harding (born 1 November 1943) is a Barbadian cricketer. He played in two first-class matches for the Barbados cricket team in 1974/75.

See also
 List of Barbadian representative cricketers

References

External links
 

1943 births
Living people
Barbadian cricketers
Barbados cricketers
People from Christ Church, Barbados